Berlin is an unincorporated community in Washington County, in the U.S. state of Texas. The community is on US Route 290 approximately two miles west of Brenham.

History
Berlin was founded in 1864. The community was originally built up chiefly by Germans.

References

Unincorporated communities in Washington County, Texas
Unincorporated communities in Texas